Kalka is a 1989 Pakistani action film, directed by Shahid Rana and produced by Ahad Malik. The film stars actors Anjuman, Sultan Rahi and Afzaal Ahmed.

Cast
 Sultan Rahi as (Kalka)
 Anjuman as (Noreen)
 Asif Khan as (ISP Saleem Nagra)
 Sangeeta as (Madam Babari)
 Talish as (ASP Sultan Khan)
 Kanwal
 Munir Zarif
 Nehmat Sarhadi as (Badal)
 Afzaal Ahmed - (Katwal)
 Adeeb as (Candi Wala)
 Munawar Saeed as (Deputy Haq Nawaz)
 Jahangir Mughal as (Shola)
 Zahir Shah as (Babbar)
 Altaf Khan as (Jimmy)
 Shafqat Cheema as (Qasim)
 Tariq Shah as (Fakharuddin)
 Nasrrullah Butt as (Tiger)

Guests actors
 Asad Bukhari as (Tari Wal)
 Tanzeem Hassan
 Asim Bukhari as (APAHAJ)
 Zamurd 
 Saiqa as (Salma)
 Shahida Mini
 Ilyas Kashmiri as (Judge)
 Bahar as (Lawyer)

Awards
 Nigar Award for Sultan Rahi as Best Actor in Punjabi-language film Kalka (1989 film).

Soundtrack
The music of Kalka is composed by M. Ashraf with lyrics penned by Waris Ludhyanvi.

Track listing

References

External links

1989 films
1989 action films
Pakistani action films
Punjabi-language Indian films
1980s Punjabi-language films
Nigar Award winners